Aiken's Wash is an archaeologically and geologically significant wash located in the Mojave National Preserve in San Bernardino County, California. The wash includes several pictograph and petroglyph sites dating from the late pre-Columbian period. The proximity of pictographs and petroglyphs is unusual in the Mojave Desert region.  The area was added to the National Register of Historic Places as the Aiken's Wash National Register District. The district comprises , including all major archaeological sites in the wash.

Description
The two largest rock art groupings are at Aiken's Arch and Milky Way Caves; other prominent groupings are at Aiken's Cove, Aiken's Tank, Metate Cliff, Shadow Cave, and The Dikes. Patterns depicted in the petroglyphs include anthropomorphs, circles and curves, grids and lattices, and occasional zoomorphs or phytomorphs; the pictographs, which mainly use red dye, show similar patterns.

The wash also includes multiple pre-Columbian habitation sites. Three rockshelters have been found in the wash; all are associated with rock art sites. In addition, a house site has been discovered near Aiken's Arch; the site includes multiple round house rings.

Geology
The wash is also one of the most significant volcano sites in the Mojave Desert. The site includes multiple extinct cinder cones and volcanic flow areas. The volcanoes originally date from two periods; one set emerged in the early Pleistocene, while the other came about in the late Pleistocene or Holocene. The most recent volcanic activity in the region most likely occurred between 800 and 1000 years ago.

References

Archaeological sites on the National Register of Historic Places in California
Geography of San Bernardino County, California
Petroglyphs in California
Volcanoes of San Bernardino County, California
Volcanism of California
Historic districts on the National Register of Historic Places in California
Volcanoes of California
Landforms of San Bernardino County, California
Cinder cones of the United States
National Register of Historic Places in San Bernardino County, California